Christine Day (born 23 August 1986) is a Jamaican sprinter who specializes in the 400 metres. She represented Jamaica at the 2012 Summer Olympics in the individual 400m and in the 4x400 metre relay. Day was eliminated in the semifinals of the individual 400m but she and teammates Rosemarie Whyte, Shericka Williams and Novlene Williams-Mills won bronze in the relay.

Day won a bronze medal at the 2014 Glasgow in the women's 400m behind teammates Stephanie McPherson and Novlene Williams-Mills. She along with Williams-Mills, McPherson and Anastasia Le-Roy won gold in the 4 x 400 metres women team and helped them in setting a games' record of 3 minutes 23.82 seconds (3:23.82) at the 2014 Commonwealth Games.

International competitions

1Representing the Americas

References

1986 births
Living people
Jamaican female sprinters
People from Saint Mary Parish, Jamaica
Athletes (track and field) at the 2012 Summer Olympics
Athletes (track and field) at the 2016 Summer Olympics
Olympic athletes of Jamaica
Medalists at the 2012 Summer Olympics
Athletes (track and field) at the 2014 Commonwealth Games
Athletes (track and field) at the 2018 Commonwealth Games
World Athletics Championships athletes for Jamaica
World Athletics Championships medalists
Commonwealth Games gold medallists for Jamaica
Olympic silver medalists for Jamaica
Olympic silver medalists in athletics (track and field)
Medalists at the 2016 Summer Olympics
Commonwealth Games medallists in athletics
IAAF Continental Cup winners
World Athletics Championships winners
Olympic female sprinters
Medallists at the 2014 Commonwealth Games
Medallists at the 2018 Commonwealth Games